American River Transportation Co., LLC (ARTCO) is a subsidiary of Cargill, Inc. and is headquartered in St. Louis, Missouri..  It provides river transportation, including barges and a shipyard; it also operates towboats on the Illinois River, Mississippi River, and Ohio River.  ARTCO Stevedoring provides bulk transfer and crane services on near New Orleans, Louisiana on the Lower Mississippi River

History 
ARTCO was founded in 1977 as a joint venture between Cargill and MEMCO Barge Line, Inc. In 1981, Cargill became the sole owner of ARTCO. Over the years, ARTCO has grown to become one of the largest barge companies in the United States.

Operations 
ARTCO operates a fleet of over 2,200 barges and 65 towboats, making it one of the largest inland river transportation companies in the United States. The company specializes in transporting agricultural products, such as grain, oilseeds, and fertilizer, as well as steel, coal, and other bulk commodities.

Safety 
Safety is a top priority for ARTCO. The company has a comprehensive safety program that includes regular safety training for employees, as well as ongoing maintenance and inspection of its vessels and equipment. ARTCO has received numerous safety awards from industry associations and regulatory agencies.

Environmental Stewardship 
ARTCO is committed to protecting the environment and operates its vessels in an environmentally responsible manner. The company has implemented a number of initiatives to reduce its environmental footprint, including the use of cleaner-burning fuels, the installation of energy-efficient equipment, and the development of innovative technologies to reduce emissions.

References

American corporate subsidiaries
Archer Daniels Midland
Companies based in Macon County, Illinois
Decatur, Illinois
Transportation companies of the United States
Transportation companies based in Illinois